Ab Chendar-e Guzenan (also Romanized as Āb Chendār-e Gūzenān; also known as Āb Chendār) is a village in Ludab Rural District, Ludab District, Boyer-Ahmad County, Kohgiluyeh and Boyer-Ahmad Province, Iran. At the 2006 census, its population was 91, in 18 families.

References 

Populated places in Boyer-Ahmad County